Hemidactylus tropidolepis, also known as Mocquard's leaf-toed gecko or Ogaden gecko,  is a species of gecko. It is found in eastern Africa (Ethiopia, Somalia, and Kenya).

References

Hemidactylus
Reptiles of Ethiopia
Reptiles of Kenya
Reptiles of Somalia
Reptiles described in 1888
Taxa named by François Mocquard